Bogomira Jakin  (born ) is a Slovenian Paralympic sitting volleyball player. She is part of the Slovenia women's national sitting volleyball team.

She competed at the 2012 Summer Paralympics finishing 6th. On club level she played for ISD Nova Gorica in 2012.

See also
 Slovenia at the 2012 Summer Paralympics

References

External links
http://players.moonfruit.com/bogomira-jakin/4577686932
http://www.gettyimages.com/photos/bogomira-jakin?excludenudity=true&sort=mostpopular&mediatype=photography&phrase=bogomira%20jakin
http://sportida.photoshelter.com/gallery/20120904-GBR-Paralympics-Paralympic-Games-London-2012-Day-7/G0000Q60RORHcD2c/2/C0000nQQMifF7QTs

1957 births
Living people
Volleyball players at the 2012 Summer Paralympics
Paralympic competitors for Slovenia
Slovenian sportswomen
Slovenian sitting volleyball players
Women's sitting volleyball players